Loek Hamers (born  22 April 2000) is a Dutch professional footballer who plays as a goalkeeper for Eerste Divisie club Roda JC Kerkrade.

Career
Hamers signed his first professional contract with Roda JC Kerkrade. He had been with the Roda youth teams since 2010 after coming over from childhood club SHH. He made his professional football debut on 30 August 2020, in a 4–0 away win over Jong Ajax. He came on in the 15th minute for the injured Jan Hoekstra and kept a clean sheet.

References

External links
 

Living people
2000 births
Roda JC Kerkrade players
Dutch footballers
Eerste Divisie players
21st-century Dutch people
People from Roermond
Footballers from Limburg (Netherlands)